British Columbia: An Untold History is a Canadian documentary series, which aired on Knowledge Network in 2021. Directed by Kevin Eastwood, the four-episode series highlights some of the lesser-known stories in the history of the Canadian province of British Columbia. The project portrays a diverse perspective of B.C.'s shared past, as told by those who have lived and/or studied it, and features the voices of authors, historians, elders, activists, community leaders, and descendants of historical figures, many of whom are members of Indigenous, Chinese, Japanese, South Asian, and Black communities.

Synopsis
The four-part documentary examines British Columbia’s dramatic history from the late 18th century through to the present, as told through interviews with figures who have lived and studied it, and presented with archival photos, recreations and aerial footage of the B.C. landscape. Indigenous, Asian, Black and European stories are interwoven to present a diverse look at the sometimes lesser-known events that define B.C. as it is known today.

Awards 
British Columbia: An Untold History won five Leo Awards: Best Documentary Series (Trish Dolman and Leena Minifie), Best Direction in a Documentary Series (Kevin Eastwood), Best Screenwriting in a Documentary Series (Eastwood), Best Picture Editing (Eddie O. and Tanya Maryniak) and Best Sound in a Documentary Series (Velcrow Ripper, Ramsay Bourquin, Kaitlyn Redcrow, Brent Calkin and J. Martin Taylor). The series also received an award of merit from the BC Historical Federation for its "significant contribution to the study or promotion of British Columbia history".

The series received five Canadian Screen Award nominations from the Academy of Canadian Cinema and Television at the 10th Canadian Screen Awards in 2022: for Best History Documentary Program or Series, Best Direction in a Documentary Series (Eastwood), Best Photography in a Documentary Program or Factual Series (Alfonso Chin and Michael Bourquin), Best Editorial Research (Leena Minifie and Jennifer Chiu), and Best Visual Research (Lanna Lucas, Casey Lees, Ben Mussett, Leah Siegel, Don Bourdon and Emma Metcalfe Hurst).

Cast

Interviews
Stephanie Allen
Joe Alphonse
Clifford Atleo
Jean Barman
John Belshaw
Tzeporah Berman
Lara Campbell
Donna Cranmer
Bill Cranmer
Severn Cullis-Suzuki
Sara Florence Davidson
John Elliot
Corky Evans
Mark Forsythe
Daniel Francis
Hamar Foster
Masako Fukawa
Don Gayton
Naveen Girn
Guujaaw
Marianne Ignace
Khelsilem
Valerie Langer
Mark Leier
Corrina Leween
Imogene Lim
Kevin Loring
Johnny Mack
Daniel Marshall
Joe Martin
Albert (Sonny) McHalsie/Naxaxalhts’i
Geoff Meggs
Charles Menzies
Rod Mickleburgh
Fran Morrison
Lou-Ann Neel
Walrus Oakenbough
Lorene Oikawa
Adele Perry
Jonathan Peyron
Adam Rudder
Lillian Sam
Calvin Sandborn
Sharanjit Sandhra Kaur
Andrew Scott
Bev Sellars
Paul Spong
Veronica Strong-Boag
Coll Thrush
Rex Weyler
David Wong
T’uy’t’tanat-Cease Wyss
Henry Yu

References

External links

2020s Canadian documentary television series
2021 Canadian television series debuts
2021 Canadian television series endings
Knowledge Network original programming